Viktor Pečovský (born 24 May 1983) is a Slovak footballer who currently plays  as a midfielder for amateur side of MFK Bytča.

Club career
On 23 June 2011, Pečovský signed a 3-year contract with Žilina. Žilina is the second club in his professional career after his 11 years with Dukla Banská Bystrica.

Pečovský retired on 11 July 2020 at pod Dubňom in a fixture against Zemplín Michalovce, where he collected his final 11 minutes and his 422nd Slovak top division appearance, creating a new record in the process. The match concluded with a 5-0 victory and Pečovský was replaced in the 12th minute by Miroslav Gono following a goal by Patrik Iľko. Pečovský's record held until April 2022, when he was replaced by Tomáš Ďubek.

International career
On 15 August 2012, he made his debut with the Slovak senior team in a 3–1 friendly win against Denmark in Odense. He scored his first goal for Slovakia on 6 September 2013 in a 1–0 away win against Bosnia and Herzegovina during a 2014 FIFA World Cup qualifier, in Zenica.

International goal

Honours

Dukla Banská Bystrica
 Slovak Cup (1): 2004–05

MŠK Žilina
 Fortuna Liga (2): 2011–12, 2016-17
 Slovnaft Cup (1): 2011–12

International
 UEFA European Under-19 Football Championship: 3rd place (2002)

Individual
 Fortuna Liga Player of the Year 2014–15

References

External links
 MŠK Žilina profile 
 

1983 births
Living people
Sportspeople from Brezno
Association football midfielders
Slovak footballers
Slovakia international footballers
Slovakia under-21 international footballers
Slovakia youth international footballers
FK Dukla Banská Bystrica players
MŠK Žilina players
ŠK Javorník Makov players
Slovak Super Liga players
2. Liga (Slovakia) players
4. Liga (Slovakia) players
UEFA Euro 2016 players